A780 may refer to:
 Motorola A780, a mobile phone
 Westernport Highway, a road in Australia